Bloody Mary originally referred to:

 Mary I of England (1516–1558), Queen of England and Ireland, so called because of her persecution of Protestants

Bloody Mary may also refer to:

Film 
 Urban Legends: Bloody Mary, a 2005 horror film
 Bloody Mary (2006 film), a 2006 horror film
 Bloody Mary (2022 film), a 2022 crime drama film
 Dead Mary or Bloody Mary, a 2007 horror film

Literature 
 Bloody Mary (DC Comics), a fictional extraterrestrial vampire
 Bloody Mary (Helix), a comic book
 Bloody Mary (Marvel Comics), a fictional telekinetic supervillain
 Bloody Mary (South Pacific), a character in Tales of the South Pacific by James Michener

Music 
 "Bloody Mary" (song), a 2011 song by Lady Gaga
 "Bloody Mary (Nerve Endings)", a 2012 song by Silversun Pickups
 "Bloody Mary", a song from the Rodgers and Hammerstein musical South Pacific
 "Bloody Mary", a 2008 song by the Alice Rose

Television 
 "Bloody Mary" (South Park), an episode of the television series South Park
 "Bloody Mary" (Supernatural), an episode of the television series Supernatural
 The Bloody Mary Show, a British comedy horror web series
 "Scary Mary", a 2011  two part episode of R.L. Stine's The Haunting Hour

Other uses 
 Bloody Mary (rapper), rapper that was a member of the group Bloods & Crips
 Bloody Mary (cocktail), a cocktail made with tomato juice, vodka, and typically spices
 Bloody Mary (folklore), a ghost said to appear in mirrors when a person repeats her name
 Bloody Mary, a boss in the 1995 action role-playing gameTerranigma
 Typhoon Mary (1960), a deadly typhoon nicknamed "Bloody Mary" by the Joint Typhoon Warning Center

See also

 Agent 077: Mission Bloody Mary, a 1965 adventure film
 The Legend of Bloody Mary, a 2008 horror film
 Mary, Mary, Bloody Mary, a 1974 horror film
 Mary, Bloody Mary, a 1999 YA novel
 "Un Blodymary", a 2006 song by Las Ketchup
 
 Bloody (disambiguation)
 Mary (disambiguation)